Stress is the debut full-length album by the Brazilian heavy, speed metal band Stress. It was released in 1982 and re-released on LP in 2002 and CD in 2005 by Dies Irae.

Track listing
All songs written by Andre Chamon Lopes (lyrics) and Roosevelt Cavalcante (music).  Arrangements by Stress.

Band members 
 Roosevelt "Bala" Cavalcante - vocals, bass
 André Lopes Chamon - drums
 Pedro Lobão - guitars
 Leonardo Renda - Keyboards

References

1982 debut albums
Stress (Brazilian band) albums